The Best of Chet Atkins & Friends is a compilation recording by American guitarist Chet Atkins, released in 1976. It peaked at number 25 on the Billboard Country Albums charts in 1977.

Atkins collaborated with a number of artists, and this 1976 LP release contains a broad spectrum, including previously unreleased songs with Dolly Parton and Boots Randolph. Other guests include Johnny Gimble, Arthur Fiedler, Lenny Breau, Jerry Reed, Merle Travis, Les Paul, and Hank Snow.

Major releases

Track listing

Side one
 "Terry on the Turnpike" (Atkins) (with Boots Randolph)
 "Sail Along Silv'ry Moon" (Harry Tobias, Percy Wenrich)
 "Sweet Georgia Brown" (Ben Bernie, Kenneth Casey, Maceo Pinkard) (with Lenny Breau)
 "Avalon" (Buddy DeSylva, Al Jolson, Vincent Rose) (with Les Paul)
 "The Ballad of New Orleans/Sugarfoot Rag" (Driftwood) (with the Boston Pops Orchestra)

Side two
 "Do I Ever Cross Your Mind" (Dolly Parton) (with Dolly Parton)
 "Frog Kissin'" (with Ray Stevens)
 "Twichy" (Jerry Reed Hubbard) (with Jerry Reed)
 "Fiddlin' Around" (Johnny Gimble) (with Johnny Gimble)
 "Poison Love" (Elmer Laird) (with Hank Snow)
 "I'll See You in My Dreams" – (Gus Kahn, Isham Jones) (with Merle Travis)

Personnel
Chet Atkins – guitar
Dolly Parton – vocals
Boots Randolph – saxophone
Charlie McCoy – harmonica
Lenny Breau – guitar
Hank Snow – guitar
Jerry Reed – guitar
Ray Stevens – vocals
Les Paul – guitar
Merle Travis – guitar
Danny Davis and The Nashville Brass – trumpet, brass section
Johnny Gimble – fiddle

References

1976 greatest hits albums
Chet Atkins compilation albums
RCA Records compilation albums